Radical Connector is a studio album by German electronica duo Mouse on Mars. It was released in 2004. It features vocal contributions from Dodo Nkishi and Niobe.

Critical reception
At Metacritic, which assigns a weighted average score out of 100 to reviews from mainstream critics, Radical Connector received an average score of 75% based on 21 reviews, indicating "generally favorable reviews".

Heather Phares of AllMusic gave the album 4.5 stars out of 5, saying: "This may not be Mouse on Mars' most ambitious album, but it's among the group's most successful -- it's not at all difficult to feel a connection to this truly intelligent dance music." Mark Richardson of Pitchfork gave the album an 8.1 out of 10, describing it as "Mouse on Mars' most conventional album" and "their most predictable in structure." Meanwhile, Kareem Estefan of Stylus Magazine gave the album a grade of C+, saying: "Even if it doesn't advance from Idiology as much as its lengthy development might imply, Radical Connector proves that ten years into the game, Jan St. Werner and Andi Toma still have no intention to repeat themselves."

Track listing

Personnel
Credits adapted from liner notes.

 Jan St. Werner – words, music, production
 Andi Toma – words, music, production
 Jupp Götz – choir (1)
 Dodo Nkishi – words (1, 2, 5, 7, 8)
 Niobe – words (3, 4, 6, 9)

References

External links
 
 

2004 albums
Mouse on Mars albums
Thrill Jockey albums